Oakohay Creek is a stream in the U.S. state of Mississippi.

Oakohay is a name derived from the Choctaw language purported to mean "mud potato". Variant names are "Coahay Creek", "Cohay Creek", "Oakahay Creek", "Ochahay Creek", and "Ocohay Creek".

References

Rivers of Mississippi
Rivers of Covington County, Mississippi
Rivers of Smith County, Mississippi
Rivers of Scott County, Mississippi
Mississippi placenames of Native American origin